The Oktoberfest Rugby 7s is a rugby sevens tournament held in Munich, Germany during the Oktoberfest event. In the first edition in 2017, Australia won the title in the final against Fiji, the Olympic champion from Rio. In 2019 South Africa won against Fiji, who made it again to the finals. Home team, Germany finished in 4th place, after losing to the All Blacks Sevens from New Zealand in the bronze medal match. In 2020 and 2021 the Oktoberfest Rugby 7s had to be cancelled due to the corona pandemic. The tournament will return to the Olympic Stadium Munich in 2022. 

Over 30,000 spectators from Germany and around the world, mostly wearing fancy dress, celebrated in 2019 on the stands and created a unique atmosphere.

Live acts, DJ and an entertainment program fill the breaks between the games over two days.

In 2017 and 2019 the German TV station “Sport 1” broadcast the tournament live on TV. Apart from that the Oktoberfest Rugby 7s were broadcast in over 60 countries worldwide.

Format
In 2017 the teams at the inaugural event were drawn into three pools of four teams each. Each team played all the others in their pool once. The top two teams from each pool advance to the Cup brackets while the top 2 third place teams also compete in the Cup/Plate. The other teams from each group play-off for the Challenge Trophy.

In 2019 only 8 teams took part at the tournament and were drawn into 2 pools of four teams each.

Teams 2017

Teams 2019

Results

References

External links

2017 rugby sevens competitions
2017–18 in German rugby union
Sports competitions in Munich
Oktoberfest